Homalopoma draperi, common name Draper's dwarf turban, is a species of small sea snail with calcareous opercula, a marine gastropod mollusk in the family Colloniidae.

Distribution
This species occurs in the Pacific Ocean off Catalina Island, California, USA

References

External links
 To Encyclopedia of Life
 To ITIS
 To World Register of Marine Species

Colloniidae
Gastropods described in 1984